Enhanced is a 2019 Canadian-Japanese action film produced, written and directed by James Mark. The film premiered at the 2019 Toronto After Dark Film Festival.

Plot
A sinister government organization hunts down mutants, and one of such is a young woman with enhanced abilities. But when she encounters even stronger serial killer who emerges on the scene, agents and mutants are forced to question their allegiances.
This is not an advertised sequel, but it is the continuation of the story from the 2017 movie "Kill Order".

Cast
George Tchortov as George Shepherd
Alanna Bale as Anna
Adrian Holmes as captain Williams
Chris Mark as David
Eric Hicks as Scott
Michael Joseph Delaney as Eli
Patrick Sabongui as Joseph
Elvis Stojko as officer Reves
Stefano DiMatteo as Marco
Jeffrey R. Smith as Danny
Dorren Lee as Fanny
Eric Daniel as Mehran
Carl Bauer as Ritchie
Kevan Kase as Joey
Dylan Mask as Jim
Alain Moussi as Abel
Tyler James Williams as Ron
Mustafa Bulut as subject 1
Jonny Caines as subject 2

Reception

Nathaniel Muir of AIPT Comics liked the film's fight scenes, while Kat Hughes of The Hollywood News called the film "[t]he big downfall" and "just a bit dull, bland, and vanilla".

Cynthia Vinney of the Comic Book Resources, compared villain in Enhanced to Heroes while the plot is reminiscent of Universal Soldier, Dark Angel and The One all mixed into one film. She also mentioned that when it comes to visuals, the film is a combo of The Terminator and X-Men.

According to Joshua Rivera of Polygon "Enhanced does very little with an absolutely bonkers twist".

References

External links

2019 action films
2010s superhero films
English-language Canadian films
English-language Japanese films
Canadian science fiction action films
Canadian superhero films
Japanese science fiction action films
Japanese superhero films
2010s English-language films
2010s Canadian films
2010s Japanese films